Sullivan High School is a public four-year high school located in the Rogers Park neighborhood on the north side of Chicago, Illinois, United States.  Sullivan is a part of the Chicago Public Schools district. Opened in 1926, the school is named for businessman and Illinois politician Roger Charles Sullivan.

History
Sullivan opened in 1926 as a junior high school under the Chicago Board of Education's plan creation of junior high schools in Chicago. The school begin serving as a traditional high school when junior high schools in the city were phased out in 1933.

In the 2010s, Sullivan High School has served a large number of refugee students. As of 2017, 45% of students were foreign-born and came from 38 different countries. That same year, the school was designated a "newcomer center" by Chicago Public Schools for its programming for refugee and immigrant students.

Athletics
Sullivan competes in the Chicago Public League (CPL) and is a member of the Illinois High School Association (IHSA). The schools sport teams are nicknamed the Tigers. Sullivan boys' soccer team were regional champions and sectional finalists in 2016 and 2017.  Sullivan girls' basketball team were regional champions in 2008–09. The boys' track and field became public league champions in 1938–39. In 1977–78, the school's football team won the Public League championship.

Notable alumni
 Ira Berkow  – New York Times sportswriter and author<tref name="Sun Times SotW"></ref>
 Elizabeth Ann Blaesing – illegitimate daughter of President Warren G. Harding
 Sidney Blumenthal – journalist and aide to Bill Clinton
 Hal Bruno – Newsweek correspondent and political director of ABC News; served as moderator for 1992's vice-presidential debate
 Shecky Greene – comedian and actor
 Robert Spencer Long – president of Shimer College
 Dick Marx – jazz pianist, arranger, and composer, best known for writing commercial jingles for Kellogg's Raisin Bran and Ken-L Ration dog food;  scored the film A League of Their Own; his son is musician Richard Marx
 Clayton Moore  – actor, best known for his portrayal of The Lone Ranger
 Danny Newman – publicist and author who worked for Jimmy Durante, Milton Berle, the New York Philharmonic, and the Lyric Opera of Chicago; pioneered the idea of subscription sales
 Art Paul – former Playboy Art Director and designer of its rabbit-head logo
 Charles Percy – U.S. Senator
 Dewey Robinson  – Major League Baseball pitcher (1979–81), playing his entire career for the Chicago White Sox; currently a minor league coach
 Jan Schakowsky – United States Representative for Illinois's 9th congressional district (1999–present)
 Gordon Segal – CEO and co-founder of Crate & Barrel
 Haskell Wexler –  two–time Oscar-winning cinematographer (Who's Afraid of Virginia Woolf?, Bound for Glory)
 Bobby Dixon - Euroleague basketball player
 Richard Alan Greenberg - Oscar-nominated special effects designer
 ruth weiss - American poet and filmmaker

References

External links

 Sullivan High School website

Educational institutions established in 1923
Public high schools in Chicago
1923 establishments in Illinois